Mažeikiai (Samogitian: Mažeikē) is a city in northwestern Lithuania, on the Venta River. It has a population of around 43,547, making it the eighth largest city in Lithuania. The city is the administrative center of Mažeikiai district municipality in Telšiai County. It is the largest city that does not have its own county.

History

Mažeikiai was first mentioned in written sources in 1335. A chronicler of the Livonian Order wrote about a campaign of the Order, during which the land of Duke Mažeika was devastated. The town started growing rapidly in 1869 when the Libau–Romny Railway connecting Vilnius and Liepāja was constructed. In 1893, the town had 13 shops and 5 alehouses. In 1894 an Eastern Orthodox church was built, and a synagogue had been founded several years earlier. In 1902 a Catholic church was established, followed by an Evangelical-Lutheran church in 1906. From 1899 to 1918 the town was called Muravyov.

In 1919 Mažeikiai became the county centre and received the rights of self-government. During the first years of independence, Mažeikiai was subject to a territorial dispute between Lithuania and Latvia because of its importance as a railway hub between the Latvian cities of Riga, Jelgava and Liepaja. In 1921 Latvian claims for the town were rejected by an international commission.

A hospital and a library were opened in 1922 and a museum in 1928. In 1939 the population of the town was recorded as 5,618. In 1940 26 industrial companies, 4 banks and a credit union operated in Mažeikiai.

In 1940 the Soviet Union occupied the town and it was annexed to the Soviet Union on 3 August 1940 as a part of the Lithuanian SSR. During World War II, Mažeikiai was under German occupation from 26 June 1941 until 31 October 1944. It was administered as a part of the Generalbezirk Litauen of Reichskommissariat Ostland. In August 1941 a mass killing occurred in which 4,000 Jews from the Mažeikiai district were killed.

In 1950 Mažeikiai became the district centre.

Origins of the name 
The name of the town is undoubtedly given after a person. In history, there are mentions of a person named Mažeika.

Economy
In 1980 an oil refinery plant "Mažeikių Nafta" was opened. Today it is one of the largest industrial plants in Lithuania. Its privatisation to Williams, an American energy company, caused many scandals and major disturbances in the Lithuanian government. Williams International, facing financial problems, sold Mažeikių Nafta to Yukos. After Yukos' bankruptcy, the Lithuanian government and Polish company PKN Orlen signed a sale agreement of Mažeikių Nafta in 2006. Also Yukos International UK B.V. signed a sale agreement with PKN Orlen, selling its Mažeikių Nafta shares to the Polish company. The buyout was finalized on 15 December 2006, with US$1,492,000,000 being paid by PKN Orlen to Yukos International, and US$851,828,900.31 to the Lithuanian Government. In 2004, Mažeikių Nafta financed the construction of the New Church of Saint Francis of Assisi, which cost 650,000 LTL. 
ORLEN Lietuva oil refinery plant

Culture
In 1928 the Mažeikiai Museum was founded by teacher Stasys Ličkūnas. According to the official website of the Mažeikiai district municipality, the museum preserves and exhibits archaeological, historical, ethnographic, and folk art collections of the Samogitia region.

Mažeikiai has one of the largest cultural centres in Lithuania. It was established in 1946 as a culture house. In 2005 it moved to a new building which has three halls: the great hall contains 750 seats, the small hall has 250 seats, while the entertainment hall has up to 500 seats. The centre has 20 amateur art collectives.

In 1922 a public library was founded in the city. In 1975 it moved to a new three-story building. In 1976 it became a central library in the district with 21 rural and 2 urban branches.

Twin towns – sister cities

Mažeikiai is twinned with:

 Havířov, Czech Republic
 Lebedyn, Ukraine
 Liezen, Austria
 Paide, Estonia
 Płock, Poland
 Saldus, Latvia
 Stendal, Germany

See also 
 Asteroid 248839 Mazeikiai named in honor of the city

References

External links

http://www.mazeikiai.lt/
http://www.mazeikiu.info Information about Mazeikiai city
https://kehilalinks.jewishgen.org/Mazeikiai/introduction.html Memorial website to the Jewish Shtetl Mazheik (Mažeikiai)

 
Cities in Telšiai County
Cities in Lithuania
Holocaust locations in Lithuania
Mažeikiai District Municipality
Municipalities administrative centres of Lithuania
Telshevsky Uyezd
Territorial disputes of Lithuania